St Fionnlagh's Chapel (St Finla's Chapel) is a ruined medieval chapel on Cara Island, Argyll and Bute, Scotland. First recorded in the 15th century, the chapel was dedicated to St Fionnlagh. The remains are protected as a category B listed building.

Notes

Listed churches in Scotland
Category B listed buildings in Argyll and Bute
Ruins in Argyll and Bute
Church ruins in Scotland
Listed ruins in Scotland
Churches in Argyll and Bute
15th-century establishments in Scotland